Hans Joachim Schliep (born 22 March 1945, in Drangstedt) is a German Lutheran theologian, pastor and author. From 1990 to 1999 he was director of the Amt für Gemeindedienst (English: Office for Community Service, since 2002 Haus kirchlicher Dienste of the  Evangelical-Lutheran Church of Hanover), and by May 2000 the commissioner for the environment (German: Umweltbeauftragter) of the Church of Hanover and the Confederation of Protestant Churches in Lower Saxony. From 1999 to 2008 Schliep was the first pastor at the Kronsberg Church Centre and founder of the congregation at the Expo-neighbourhood in Kronsberg, Hanover, Lower Saxony, Germany.

Biography

Study
Schliep finished junior high school in 1961 and started an apprenticeship at the Seebeck Shipyard in Bremerhaven as an industrial clerk and worked there until 1965. In 1969 he attended the Jung-Stilling-College in Espelkamp (Ecclesiastical Institute for the attainment of higher education) for his high school diploma and finished a study of Protestant theology, philosophy and in social sciences. In 1974 Schliep gained a first theology degree at the Ruhr University Bochum and served subsequently as vicar for the Evangelical Church of Westphalia at the Stiepel Village Church in Stiepel, Bochum, Westphalia.

Career
Schliep was ordained in October 1976 and was pastor at the Evangelical Lutheran Church of the Cross in Bremerhaven.

In  1983 Schliep was appointed as department head (Dezernent), titled Oberkirchenrat (superior ecclesiastical councillor) to the Hanover Regional Church Office (German: Landeskirchenamt Hannover) of the Church of Hanover responsible for the training of pastors, adult education, folk high schools ("Heimvolkshochschulen") and other things.

On 1 March 1990 Schliep was appointed director of the Amt für Gemeindedienst (Office of Community Service) and commissioner for the environment (until 31 May 2000) of the Church of Hanover and the Confederation of Protestant Churches in Lower Saxony. From 1991 he was the coordinator and manager of the Church of Hanover Help for Chernobyl Children (since 1994: AG Hilfe für Tschernobylkinder). During this time he was the first and only Commissioner for Aviation for the Church of hannover. From 1994 to 1999 Schliep was in personal union director of the Amt für Gemeindedienst, department head at the Hanover Regional Church Office and an extraordinary member in the college of the Regional Church Office (German: Ausserordentliches Mitglied im -Kollegium- des Landeskirchenamtes Hannover).

Schliep left his leadership offices at his own request in April 1999 and became pastor at the Kronsberg Church Centre (official Exhibit (ExpoNAT) of the Expo 2000) in Kronsberg (Hanover), which was established in 2000 in connection with the EXPO 2000 in Hanover (motto "Humankind-Nature-Technology"). As Kronsberg Pastor he was founder and responsible for building up the congregation at the development area (Expo-settlement), created for Expo 2000 at Kronsberg, Hanover. 
The Christ Pavilion on the Expo terrain belonged to the congregation of Pastor Schliep. From 2002 to 2008 he was moreover pastor for the congregation of Wülferode Chapel. In 2011 he was awarded the plaque of honour of the City District Council Kirchrode-Bemerode-Wülferode (German: Ehrenplakette des Stadtbezirkrates Kirchrode-Bemerode-Wülferode).

From September 2008 to March 2010 Schliep was theological advisor at the Center for Health Ethics (German: Zentrum für Gesundheitsethik) with the Loccum Academy (German: Evangelische Akademie Loccum) and again the Commissioner for the environment of the Church of Hanover. On 1 April 2010, Pastor Schliep went into retirement, but still retained his office as commissioner for the environment of the Church of Hanover to March 2012. Until 2016 he worked as pastor, substitute at the Marktkirche und Neustädter Kirche in Hanover for example and as a Speaker and consultant.
He wrote and kept several radio devotions (NDR and others).

Other functions and memberships (selection) 
 1983-1989:Chairman of the Lutherstift Falkenburg charity
 1983-1989: School board of the Lower Saxon Hermannsburg Lutheran adult education centre (German: :de:Niedersächsische Lutherische Heimvolkshochschule Hermannsburg)
 1983-02/1990: Chairman of the working group pastoral care (German: AG Seelsorge) of the Church of Hanover (Member until 1999)
 1990- 1999: Member of the Board of the Lutheran publican House (lutherisches Verlagshaus) and co-publisher of the "Vorlagen" Magazine of the Lutheran publican House  
 1983-2000: the Church of Hanover responsible manager for talks with business and unions 
 1984-2001: Chairman of the Examining Commission of the second theological examination (per ministerio) of the Church of Hanover (Member until 2004)
 1985-1994: Member of the EKD-chamber of Education
 1985/86: Guest lecturer at the Protestant University of Applied Sciences and Arts (Evangelische Fachhochschule Hannover)
 1992-1998: Chairman of the Ev. Village assistants work Lower Saxony (German: Evangelisches Dorfhelferinnenwerk Niedersachsen )
 1992-1998: Schliep represented the Church of Hanover in the Board of Trustees of the Lower Saxon State Foundation for Children of Chernobyl (German: Landesstiftung Kinder von Tschernobyl).
 since 10/2015: Member of the board of the association Encounter - Christians and Jews in Lower Saxony (German: Begegnung - Christen und Juden in Niedersachsen e.V.)

Published (selection)

Books and writings 
 Werkzeug und Denkzeug - Zur Ethik der Technik, 1986, 
 Der Evangelisch Soziale Kongreß 1905 in Hannover, Hanover: Evang.-Luth. Landeskirche Hannover, 1996
 10 Jahre Evangelisches Kirchenzentrum Hannover-Kronsberg - Schrift zum 10-jährigen Jubiläum der Einweihung des Ev. Kirchenzentrums Kronsberg, Hanover: Ev.-Luth. Kirchengemeinde St.Johannis Bemerode, 2010
 Was uns unbedingt angeht... - Kronsberger Predigten, Saarbrücken: Fromm-Verlag, 2012, 
 Gläubiger Realismus - Kronsberger Reden, Saarbrücken: Fromm-Verlag, 2012, 
 Mach es mit meinem Ende gut - für ein Lebensende in Würde, Saarbrücken: Fromm-Verlag, 2012, 
 Mehr als meine Augen sehen - Kronsberger Predigten 2, Saarbrücken: Fromm-Verlag, 2013, 
 Ein unglaublicher Glaube - Kronsberger Predigten 3, Saarbrücken: Fromm-Verlag, 2014, 
 Der Werdendste, der wird - Rilkes religiöse Poesie am Rande des Christentums, Saarbrücken: Fromm-Verlag, 2015, 
 Auf dem Tische Brot und Wein- Poesie und Religion bei Georg Trakl, Fromm Verlag, 2019,  (translated and published in English, Spanish, Portuguese, Italian language)
 English edition: on the Table Bread and wine- poetry and Religion in the works of Georg Trakl, Lambert Academic Publishing (LAP), 2020,  
 Christus in der Arbeitswelt- Der Sozial-und Kirchenreformer Wilhelm Fahlbusch (1929 bis 2014), Fromm Verlag, 2020,  Review: Wolfgang Vögele, Arbeitswelt und Sozialethik in Magazin für Theologie und Ästhetik, Heft 129, 2021 
 Faithfull realism: Kronsberg Speeches, Lambert Academic Publishing (LAP),2020

Articles and others  
 Hans Joachim Schliep, „Sedierung am Lebensende“, in: Ethik in der Medizin, vol. 12, June 2010, 
 Hans Joachim Schliep, „Anfang und Ende des Lebens“, in: Berliner Theologische Zeitschrift, vol. 12, No. 2 (1995), 
 Erarbeitung der EKD-Stellungnahme „Zur Achtung vor dem Leben“ (1987)
 EKD-Text 37 „Ev. Bildungsverständnis in einer sich wandelnden Arbeitsgesellschaft“ (1991) (federführend)
 Hans Joachim Schliep, „Politik, Umwelt, Staat“, in: Evangelische Glaubensfibel, Gütersloh: CMZ:Verlag Gütersloher Verlagshaus, pp. 188seqq.  
 Evangelischer Taschenkatechismus, CMZ-Verlag am Birnbach. Hans Joachim Schliep: Politik S. 351ff 
 Hans Joachim Schliep, „Seelsorgebewegung und Kirchenleitung. Zwischen Initiative und Institution“, in: Wege zum Menschen, vol. 45. (1993), pp. 443seqq.
Hans Joachim Schliep, „Kirche in der Erlebnisgesellschaft“, in: Pastoralthologie - Monatsschrift für Wissenschaft und Praxis in Kirche und Gesellschaft, vol. 85. (No. June/1996), pp. 211seqq.
 Hans Joachim Schliep, „Ich suche allerlanden eine neue Stadt Offenbarung 21 und 22“, in: Und Sie sahen eine Neue Erde - 20 Jahre Arbeitsgemeinschaft der Umweltbeauftragten in der Evangelischen Kirche in Deutschland, 
Jacques Gassmann, Apokalypse, mit Hans Joachim Schliep: (K)ein Buch mit sieben Siegeln- Eine Kleine Lesehilfe Verlag: Edition Braus (1992),
 Schliep, Hans Joachim: Gott und die Alten -Theologische Überlegungen in kirchenpraktischer Absicht zum dritten und vierten Alter in: Burbach, Christiane; Merkel, Erst Christoph (Hg): Aufbruch zum Diesseits,. Festschrift für Wilhelm Fahlbusch . Ev. Fachhochschule Hannover. Hannover 1995
 Hans Joachim Schliep: Jenseits der Spezialisierung. Versuch, ein gemeinsames Selbstverständnis kirchlicher Dienste, Werke und Verbände wiederzuentdecken In: Anhelm, Fritz Erich (Hg):  Loccumer Protokolle, Loccum 1995
 Hans Joachim Schliep: Gerhard Uhlhorn und die Sonntagsfrage in: Lutherische Monatshefte, 27. Jahrgang, 1988, S: 510-515, 
 Hans Joachim Schliep: Die Soziale Verantwortung der Kirche: Eine Erinnerung an Abt Gerhard Uhlhorn in: Jahrbuch der Gesellschaft für Niedersachsen, 1992, S. 185–200
 Hans Joachim Schliep: Gläubiger Realismus, Das Ethische bei Paul Tillich, in: Luth. Monatshefte, 25.Jahrgang, 1986, S. 414–418, 
 Hans Joachim Schliep: Evangelisch aus gutem Grund. Gedanken zum Evangelisch sein, in: Arbeitshilfe zur Kirchenvorstands- und Gemeindekirchenratswahl 2000, hg. von den Informations- und Pressestellen der Ev.-luth. Landeskirchen Hannovers, Braunschweig, Oldenburg und Schaumburg-Lippe, S. 7–13
 Hans Joachim Schliep: Kirche und Markt - Kirche muss sich den Konkurrenten stellen, in: Armin Pollehn u. a.: Combook. Kommunikationshandbuch für kirchliche Öffentlichkeitsarbeit, Luth. Verlagshaus, Hannover 2001, S. 153–158,  (zuerst veröffentlicht unter dem Titel "Kirche auf dem Markt" in: Dialog, Hannover 1 / 1997, S. 6–9
 in Im Namen Gottes 1 Kanzelreden zur 1. Perikopenreihe von Christoph Dinkel, Radius Verlag, 2008  Predigt zu Johannes 3 1-8 (9-15) S.274 ff
 Hans Joachim Schliep: Ein Stein von Ulrich Rückriem im Ev. Kirchenzentrum Kronsberg in Markus Zinn (Hg.): Siehe! Zeitgenössische Kunst in Evangelischen Kirchen, Frankfurt/M. 2007.  S. 139–144
Hans Joachim Schliep: 4.4: Globale Verantwortung,4.4.1: Die natürlichen Lebensgrundlagen In Evangelischer Erwachsenenkatechismus,  VELKD; Gütersloher Verlagshaus, 8. Auflage 2010
Hans Joachim Schliep: Zum Verhältnis zwischen Mensch und Tier: Theologisch-Ethische Grundlegung: S. 7–17 in Kirchlicher Dienst auf dem Lande (KDL) der Ev.-Luth. Landeskirche Hannovers im Haus kirchlicher Dienste, Themenheft Landwirtschaftliche Nutztierhaltung, 2011
 Hans Joachim Schliep: Rez. zu: Kirche in Bewegten Zeiten, Herausgeber: Hans Otte u.a: in Jahrbuch der Gesellschaft für Niedersächsische Kirchengeschichte, 109. Band 2011, V.Ö: 2012
 Hans Joachim Schliep: Senior Bödeker und der Tierschutz in Hannover, in: Jahrb. der Ges. f. nds. Kirchengeschichte 110. Bd. (2012), S. 199–204
 Hans Joachim Schliep: Rez. zu Dirk Riesener: Volksmission zwischen Volkskirche und Republik. 75 Jahre Haus kirchlicher Dienste der Ev.-luth. Landeskirche Hannovers, Hannover 2012, in: Jahrb. der Ges. f. nds. Kirchengeschichte 110. Bd. (2012), S. 231–234 
  Hans Joachim Schliep: Der Evangelisch-Soziale Kongress in Hannover 1905 in Jahrbuch der Gesellschaft für Niedersächsische Kirchengeschichte 2013 (JGNKG - 111. Band), S. 191–219.
  Hans Joachim Schliep: Rez. zu "Zu brüderlichem Gespräch vereinigt". Die Rundschreiben der Bekenntnisgemeinschaft der Ev.-luth. Landeskirche Hannovers 1933-1944, hg. v. Karl-F. Oppermann, 3 Bände, 2004 S., mit Abb., Hannover 2013
 Hans Joachim Schliep:  Rez. zu Kirche im Widerspruch. Texte aus der Bekennenden Kirche Kurhessen-Waldeck, hg. v. Michael Dorhs u. a., Band II, 1.447 S., mit Abb., Darmstadt 2013
 Hans Joachim Schliep: Rez. zu Horst Hirschler / Ludolf Ulrich (Hg.): Kloster Loccum - Geschichten, Hannover 2012, in: Jahrb. der Ges. f. nds. Kirchengeschichte 110. Bd. (2012), S. 254–256
 Hans Joachim Schliep: Rezension zu Hauke Marahrens: Praktizierte Staatskirchenhoheit im Nationalsozialismus. Die Finanzabteilungen in der nationalsozialistischen Kirchenpolitik und ihre Praxis in den Landeskirchen von Hannover, Braunschweig und Baden, Göttingen 2014 [JGNKG 2014, S. 186–190]
 Hans Joachim Schliep: Rezension zu Axel Wunderlich: Re-education durch Rechristianisierung? Die Stellung der hann. Landeskirche zur NS-Herrschaft und Demokratiegründung nach 1945, Frankfurt 2014 [JGNKG 2014, S. 196–199]
 Hans Joachim Schliep: Rezension zu Dieter Bischop u. a. (Hg.): Burg und Kirche in Wulsdorf, Bremerhaven 2014 [JGNKG 2014, S. 210–212]
 Hans Jochim Schliep:  Serie: Liebe, Ehe, Familie in Evangelische Zeitung für Niedersachsen, 10 Folgen, erste Folge 18. Mai 2014.
 Hans Joachim Schliep: "Protestantische Ethik und Moderner Sozialstaat - Fernwirkungen der Reformation" (Kongressbericht 4. / 5. April 2014 in Berlin, Franz. Friedrichstadtkirche)
 Hans Joachim Schliep: Balanceakt. Interpretation einer Karikatur von Saul Steinberg, in: Ev. Zeitung Nr. 24 vom 14.06.2015, S. 24.
 Hans Joachim Schliep:  Protestant Ethics and the Modern Welfare State, in: G. Wegner (Hg.): The Legitimacy of the Welfare State, Leipzig 2015, S. 278–295 - 
 Hans Joachim Schliep: Der antiquierte Mensch - Was aus uns noch werden kann, in: AUFSCHLÜSSE - ZEITSCHRIFT FÜR SPIRITUELLE IMPULSE, hg. v. Gruppe 153, Nr. 58 / September 2015, S. 21–27
 Hans Joachim Schliep: Serie: Reformation und Technik in Evangelische Zeitung für Niedersachsen, 5 Artikel, 2. Oktober 2016 (Erste V.ö)
 Hans Joachim Schliep: Theodor Lohmann - ein lutherischer Sozialreformer, in: Jahrbuch der Gesellschaft für Niedersächsische Kirchengeschichte (JGNKG 114. Bd. 2016 / ISSN 0072-4238), S. 173–226.
 Hans Joachim Schliep: Rez. zu Peter Schyga/Dirk Glufke: Wider die Vergottung des Volkstums und der Rasse. Die öffentlichen Einwürfe des Goslarers Pastors Holtermann gegen das NS-Regime, Wolfenbüttel 2015, in: JGNKG 114. Bd. 2016, S. 292–295.
 Hans Joachim Schliep: Rez. zu Gerd Meyer: Grenzgänger der evangelischen Kirche, Berlin 2014, in: JGNKG 114. Bd. 2016, S. 301–303.
 Hans Joachim Schliep: Reformations-Notwendigkeiten, in: Aufschlüsse - Zeitschrift für spirituelle Impulse, Nr. 66 / September 2017 (hg. v. Gruppe 153 - Ev.-luth. Missionsdienst e. V.), S. 28–34
 Hans Joachim Schliep: Reformation - Ressource für morgen?, in: Rundbrief Nr. 76 / August 2017 der EAfA (Ev. Arbeitsgemeinschaft für Altenarbeit in der Ev. Kirche in Deutschland), S. 1–7
 Hans Joachim Schliep: nun  springt über die Mauer, geht rein!-Eine Skizze zum Kirchlichen Dienst in der Arbeitswelt in der Ev.-luth. Landeskirche Hannovers in Priorität für die Arbeit-Profile kirchlicher Präsenz in der Arbeitswelt gestern und heute; Festschrift für Günter Brakelmann zum 90. Geburtstag.; Schriften des Netzwerkes zur Erforschung des Sozialen Protestantismus Band 1,  Hrsg. Traugott Jähnichen, Roland Pelikan, Sigrid Reihs, Johnanes Rehm, Lit-Verlag ISBN 978-3-643-14941-1, S. 73-86.

Editor 
 "Vorlagen" Aufsatzreihe Hg. von Horst Hirschler in Verbindung mit Gerhard Isermann, Hans May und Hans Joachim Schliep: Axel Freiherr von Campenhausen: Staat und Kirche unter dem Grundgesetz, Eine Orientierung »Vorlagen. Neue Folge 22«. Lutherisches Verlagshaus 
 Aufsatzreihe "Vorlagen" Hg. Horst Hirschler in Verbindung mit Gerhard Isermann, Hans May und Hans Joachim Schliep: Jan Olaf Rüttgart: Schweige und höre: Erfahrungen aus Meditation und geistlicher Betrachtung, Vorlagen. Neue Folge Heft 19. Lutherisches Verlagshaus, Hannover 
 Vorlagen. Neue Folge 21: Fremd sein. Systematisch-theologische Überlegungen. In: J.Ringleben / Kl.Winkler, Umgang mit Fremden, Luther.Verlagshaus Hannover 1994 (Vorlagen.NF 21). 
 Vorlagen. Neue Folge 23: Ulrich von der Steinen:  Christliche Verantwortung in Friedensgefährdeter Welt-eine konfliktethische Orientierung , Lutherisches Verlagshaus, 1994 
 Hans Joachim Schliep (Herausgeber als Direktor des Amtes Für Gemeindedienst): Beate Blatz: Erbstücke aus der Hannoverschen Landeskirche, 50 Jahre Amt für Gemeindedienst, Missionshandlung Hermannsburg, 1991, Hans Joachim Schliep: Zur Herausgabe S.9/10, kapitel 6: Auftrag, S 252–266

About/mentioned Pastor Schliep (selection) 
 :de:Dirk Riesener: Volkmission-75 Jahre Haus kirchlicher Dienste (House of Church Services)-früher Amt für Gemeindedienst- der Evangelisch-lutherischen Landeskirche Hannovers, Lutherisches Verlagshaus, 2012, S. 16, 18, 429, 453, 467, 470, 471, 472, 506, 572, 581, 582, 584, 585. 586, 587, 599 und Gemeindeaufbau auf dem Kronsberg; S. 556–559

External links
 
 Hans-Joachim Schliep in der Predigtdatenbank

References

Living people
German Lutheran theologians
20th-century German Lutheran clergy
20th-century German Protestant theologians
21st-century German Protestant theologians
1945 births
Clergy from Hanover
People from Bremerhaven
German non-fiction writers
Expo 2000
Ruhr University Bochum alumni
German male non-fiction writers
21st-century German Lutheran clergy